The 1978 Algerian Cup Final was the 16th final of the Algerian Cup. The final took place on May 1, 1978, at Stade 5 Juillet 1962 in Algiers with kick-off at 20:00.

Pre-match

Details

References

Cup
Algeria
Algerian Cup Finals
USM Alger matches